Justus Strid (born 29 April 1987) is a retired Danish figure skater. He is the 2012 Golden Spin of Zagreb bronze medalist, a three-time Nordic silver medalist, and a seven-time Danish national champion.

Career
Strid originally competed for Sweden. In 2004, he moved to Hørsholm, Denmark to be coached by Henrik Walentin and Julia Sandstrom. He himself began working as a coach at about the same time, teaching skating to children. He later changed coaches, deciding to work with his brother, Kalle Strid, and Martin Johansson. He lives in the center of Copenhagen and trains in Skatingclub Copenhagen (SKK).

Strid began skating for Denmark in the 2007–08 season. This was after the Danish skating federation asked him to represent them. He won his first national title that season. He debuted at the European and World Championships in 2011. He did not qualify for the free skate at either event.

Strid reached the free skate at the 2012 European Championships in Sheffield, England, where he finished 20th. He was also successful at the 2013 European Championships in Zagreb, Croatia and 2013 World Championships in London, Ontario, Canada.

On April 18, 2015, Strid announced his retirement from competitive figure skating.

Programs

Results
CS: Challenger Series; JGP: Junior Grand Prix

References

External links 

Justus Strid at Figure Skating Online

1987 births
Living people
Danish male single skaters
Figure skaters at the 2007 Winter Universiade
Sportspeople from Copenhagen